Shuqrah, also Shaqrāʾ or Shuqrāʾ, is a coastal town in southern Yemen. It was the capital of the Fadhli Sultanate until the capital moved to Zinjibar in 1962, although the royal residence remained in Shuqrah.

See also
 Hadhramaut / Sarat Mountains
 Harra es-Sawad

References

Populated places in Abyan Governorate
Populated coastal places in Yemen